Adrián Augusto Barrera Guarderas is an Ecuadorian doctor and politician who served as the Metropolitan Mayor of Quito from 2009 to 2014.

External links
Profile on Quito's website 

Living people
1961 births
Mayors of Quito
People from Quito
PAIS Alliance politicians